How to Be a Gentleman is an American sitcom television series that originally aired on CBS from September 29, 2011, to June 23, 2012. Lead actor David Hornsby created the series, adapting the nonfiction book of the same name by John Bridges.

How to Be a Gentleman received a thirteen episode order for its initial season and the series was placed on the network’s Thursday night lineup at 8:30 PM Eastern, replacing Rules of Engagement in that slot as the latter series was going to move to Saturday nights once it launched for the season. The first two episodes, however, failed to draw a high rating and were unable to hold the audience of lead in program The Big Bang Theory, which was CBS’ highest rated sitcom. On October 7, 2011, CBS cancelled the series after three low-rated episodes. They also cut the episode order from 13 to 9 episodes, which effectively ended production as the series had just finished its ninth episode when the announcement was made. CBS announced that Rules of Engagement would be retaking its former time slot shortly thereafter, with How to Be a Gentleman moving to Saturday nights.

Although the reduction in episodes and move to Saturday did not officially result in the series’ cancellation, CBS finally pulled the plug after one further episode had aired after its ratings reflected a loss of half of the audience from the previous program, a rerun of Two and a Half Men. CBS later made the decision to burn off the remaining episodes on Saturday evenings over the summer, beginning on May 26.

Premise
The series chronicles two former high school classmates, uptight etiquette columnist Andrew Carlson (Hornsby) and the more freewheeling, Iraq war veteran and personal trainer Bert Lansing (Kevin Dillon). The two had an antagonistic relationship in high school but as adults, the two men feel like they can learn from each other and become friends.

Cast
David Hornsby as Andrew Carlson
Kevin Dillon as Bert Lansing
Dave Foley as Jerry Dunham
Mary Lynn Rajskub as Janet
Rhys Darby as Mike
Nancy Lenehan as Diane Carlson

Episodes

Reception
The show received negative reviews from critics. It averaged a score of 45 out of 100 on Metacritic. The website's users have given it a 3.7 out of 10, indicating generally unfavorable reviews.

The premiere recorded 8.98 million viewers and a 2.7 Adults 18-49 rating. This rating compared poorly to that of its lead-in, The Big Bang Theory, which recorded 14.74 million viewers and a 4.9 in the 18-49 demo, as well as the shows in CBS's Monday night comedy block for the same week, all of which ranked in the top 25 for the week with Adults 18-49.

Home media
The complete series of How to be a Gentleman was released on DVD and digital on June 9, 2020.

References

External links
 

2010s American sitcoms
2011 American television series debuts
2012 American television series endings
CBS original programming
English-language television shows
Television shows based on books
Television series by Media Rights Capital
Television series by CBS Studios
Television shows set in Chicago